Bettina Belitz (Heidelberg, September 21, 1973) is a German writer and journalist.

After studying history and literature, she worked for Die Rheinpfalz and other publications.

She has a son, and lives currently in Westerwald.

Works 
 Splitterherz Script 5, Bindlach 2010.
 Scherbenmond. (2. Teil) Script 5, Bindlach 2011
 Dornenkuss. (3. Teil) Script 5, Bindlach 2011
 Sturmsommer. Thienemann, Stuttgart 2010
 Freihändig. Thienemann, Stuttgart 2010
 Fiona Spiona. Bd. 1. Falsch gedacht, Herr Katzendieb! Loewe, Bindlach 2010
 Fiona Spiona. Bd. 2. Ein Hering mit fiesen Gedanken. Loewe, Bindlach 2010.
 Fiona Spiona. Bd. 3. Ein Popo geistert umher. Loewe, Bindlach 2010
 Fiona Spiona. Bd. 4. Kapitän Feinripp geht baden. Loewe, Bindlach 2010
 Fiona Spiona. Bd. 5. Angriff der Rollmöpse. Loewe, Bindlach 2011
 Fiona Spiona. Bd. 6. 8 Weihnachtsmänner sind einer zu viel. Loewe, Bindlach 2011
 Luzie & Leander. Bd. 1. Verflucht himmlisch. Loewe, Bindlach 2010
 Luzie & Leander. Bd. 2. Verdammt feurig. Loewe, Bindlach 2010
 Luzie & Leander. Bd. 3. Verzwickt chaotisch. Loewe, Bindlach 2011
 Luzie & Leander. Bd. 4. Verblüffend stürmisch. Loewe, Bindlach 2011
 Luzie & Leander. Bd. 5. Verwünscht gefährlich. Loewe, Bindlach 2012

External links 
DNB
Website 

1973 births
Writers from Heidelberg
Living people

German women writers
German women journalists